Imus is a surname. Notable people with the surname include:

 Don Imus (1940–2019), American television and radio host 
 Fred Imus (1942–2011), American radio host and the younger brother of radio talk show host Don Imus
 Deirdre Imus (born 1964), American author and wife of Don Imus